Johanne Modder (born 12 July 1960) is a German politician for the SPD and since 2013 parliamentary leader 'Fraktionsvorsitzende' for its party in the Landtag of Lower Saxony; federal state diet of Lower Saxony.

Life and politics

Modder was born 1960 in the Frisian village of Bunde and became member of the left-wing SPD in 1986.  

Modder became member of the lower-Saxonian parliament in Hanover in 2003. 
Since 2013 it is Fraktionsvorsitzende (parliamentary leader) of the SPD in Lower-Saxony.

References 

Living people
1960 births
Social Democratic Party of Germany politicians
21st-century German politicians
Politicians from Lower Saxony